John Boyd Mullan (December 27, 1863 in Rochester, Monroe County, New York – August 15, 1955 in Rochester, NY) was an American politician from New York.

Life
Mullan was a member of the New York State Senate (46th D.) from 1915 to 1921, sitting in the 138th, 139th, 140th, 141st, 142nd, 143rd and 144th New York State Legislatures. He co-sponsored with Assemblyman Bert P. Gage the "Mullan–Gage Act", New York State's version of the Volstead Act, which was enacted in 1921, and repealed a few years later. Mullan resigned his seat on July 28, 1921, to accept an appointment as Postmaster of Rochester.

Sources
 Quits Senate to Be Postmaster in NYT on July 29, 1921
 JOHN BOYD MULLAN in NYT on August 16, 1955 (subscription required)

1863 births
1955 deaths
Republican Party New York (state) state senators
Politicians from Rochester, New York
New York (state) postmasters